Johann Baptist Zehetmair (23 October 1936 – 27 November 2022) was a German teacher and politician.

Zehetmair died on 27 November 2022, at the age of 86.

References

1936 births
2022 deaths
20th-century German educators
20th-century German politicians
Members of the Landtag of Bavaria
Ministers of the Bavaria State Government
People from Erding
Place of death missing
Christian Social Union in Bavaria politicians
Knights Commander of the Order of Merit of the Federal Republic of Germany
21st-century German politicians
Ludwig Maximilian University of Munich alumni